Hồng Ngự is a rural district of Đồng Tháp province in the Mekong Delta region of Vietnam. As of 2009 the district had a population of 150,050. The district covers an area of 209.74 km². The district capital lies at Thường Thới Tiền.

On December 23, 2008, Hồng Ngự township, the communes of An Bình A, An Bình B, Bình Thạnh, Tân Hội and a portion of Thường Lạc commune were separated from the district to form the new district-level town of Hồng Ngự.

Divisions
The district is divided into the following communes:
Hồng Ngự
Thường Thới Tiền (commune-level town)
Phú Thuận A
Phú Thuận B
Long Thuận
Long Khánh A
Long Khánh B
Thường Lạc
Thường Thới Hậu A
Thường Thới Hậu B
Thường Phước 1
Thường Phước 2

References

Districts of Đồng Tháp province